Sliplining is a technique for repairing leaks or restoring structural stability to an existing pipeline. It involves installing a smaller, "carrier pipe" into a larger "host pipe", grouting the annular space between the two pipes, and sealing the ends. Sliplining has been used since the 1940s. 

The most common material used to slipline an existing pipe is high-density polyethylene (HDPE), but fiberglass-reinforced pipe (FRP) and PVC are also common. Sliplining can be used to stop infiltration and restore structural integrity to an existing pipe.

Installation methods
There are two methods used to install a slipline: continuous and segmental.

 Continuous sliplining uses a long continuous pipe, such as HDPE, Fusible PVC, or Welded Steel Pipe, that are connected into continuous pieces of any length prior to installation. The continuous carrier pipe is pulled through the existing host pipe starting at an insertion pit and continuing to a receiving pit. Either the insertion pit, the receiving pit, or both can be manholes or other existing access points if the size and material of the new carrier pipe can manoeuvre the existing facilities.

 Segmental sliplining is very similar to continuous sliplining. The difference is primarily based on the pipe material used as the new carrier pipe. When using any bell and spigot pipe such as FRP, PVC, HDPE or Spirally Welded Steel Pipe, the individual pieces of pipe are lowered into place, pushed together, and pushed along the existing pipe corridor.

Using either method the annular space between the two pipes must be grouted. In the case of sanitary sewer lines, the service laterals must be reconnected via excavation.

Advantages
Sliplining is generally a very cost-effective rehabilitation method. It is also very easy to install and requires tools and equipment widely available to any pipeline contractor. Segmental sliplining may not require bypassing of the existing flow.

Limitations
The new pipe will generally have a significantly reduced cross sectional area because of the size difference between the inside diameter of the existing pipe and the outside diameter of the new pipe, as well as the wall thickness of the new pipe. Sewer laterals must be reconnected via excavation. Laterals can be welded to liner without excavation if man entry size pipe. Installation usually requires excavation at the insertion and receiving pits. Continuous sliplining generally requires bypassing the existing flow. Storm culverts are often installed without bypass pumping.

If the HDPE pipe has been butt welded, the external bead must be removed from the pipe, which is done with an 'external de-beader' tool. This provides a smooth exterior on the HDPE pipe, allowing it to pass through the existing pipe easily. Because the weld bead does not contribute any strength to the butt-welded join, removing it is no detriment to the strength or pressure rating of the pipeline.

References

 Center for Underground Infrastructure Research and Education CUIRE
 Mohammed Najafi, PhD, PE and Sanjov Gokhale, PhD, PE, Trenchless Technology (New York: McGraw Hill, 2004), p. 295-311. Available from Water Environment Federation at http://www.e-wef.org/timssnet/static/OM/WPM404.htm

Trenchless technology